Coupled is an American dating game show that aired on Fox from May 17 to August 2, 2016. It was hosted by television personality, Terrence J and created by Mark Burnett, of Survivor, The Apprentice, Are You Smarter Than a 5th Grader?, Shark Tank, and The Voice, as well as Ben Newmark, Dan Newmark and Larry Barron.

Filming took place in Anguilla. The cast included Miss Arizona USA 2009, Alicia-Monique Blanco; Miss Colorado USA 2015, Talyah Polee; host, Domonique Price, and American singer-songwriter, TV personality, and former collegiate athlete; Alex Lagemann.

Tyler Gattuso was in the running to be a cast member on Big Brother 17, but was ultimately not chosen due to the news being leaked by online media and his Instagram hinting at the news suggesting he wasn't going to be active for quite a while. A few days later, after the cast for Big Brother was announced, he was ranting on Twitter, shortly deleting them and deactivating his account.

On August 8, 2016, Fox canceled the series after one season.

Premise
Coupled features 12 single women who are on the quest for love. Each week different men come to the Caribbean Island and meet the women. After meeting, the women have the choice to go right — saying yes to pursuing the man some more — and join him at the Tiki bar.  Alternately, they can choose to go left — saying no to spending any more time with the man — and go back to the bungalow to wait for the next contestant. This process is inspired by the app, Tinder, in which you swipe left or right depending on your preference.

The women who choose to go to the tiki bar will await the man, where he will then pick two women to pursue further at the villa. Once at the villa, the man will spend some individual time with each of the women to see which one he has the most chemistry or connections with. At the end of the night, he will select one of the women to stay with him at the villa becoming Coupled and the other one will go back to the bungalow to await the next guy.

At the end of their six-week stay on Anguilla, the couples will be faced with the decision to continue their relationship back in the United States or to end it. The women who want to continue the relationship will join their partner waiting for them at a helicopter pad, while the women who do not want to continue the relationship will not join the men.

During the show, the contestants are given cell phones which they can use to interact with each other. Some of the text messages are featured on the show to create a dialogue and convey more drama.

Contestants

Couples that Stayed Together:
- Lindsay and Alex
- TT and Brandon
- Lisa and Ben

Couples that Broke Up:
- Alex and Jeffrey
- Alicia and Tyler 
- Ashley and BT

Contestant Progress

 The woman chose to go left back to the Bungalows to await the next man.
 The woman chose to go right to the Tiki Bar to await the man.
 The woman was selected by the man to go to the VILLA, but was not chosen to stay.
 The woman was selected by the man to stay at the VILLA with him.
 The woman decided to SWITCH to a different man at the VILLA.
 The woman LEFT the island and went home.
 The woman LEFT the island and went home because no more men were coming.
 The woman and/or man decided to be Not Coupled when they left the island.
 The woman and man decided to stay COUPLED when they left the island.

Episodes

References

Fox Broadcasting Company original programming
2010s American reality television series
2016 American television series debuts
2016 American television series endings
American dating and relationship reality television series
English-language television shows
Television shows filmed in Anguilla
Television series by MGM Television